The Orange Line of the Jaipur Metro is a proposed rapid transit line for the city of Jaipur, India.

Route

See also

Jaipur Metro
Pink Line
List of Jaipur Metro stations
Jaipur BRTS
List of rapid transit systems in India

References

Jaipur Metro lines
Proposed rapid transit in India
Airport rail links in India
Underground rapid transit in India